The Cathedral Basilica of St. Lawrence , also called Santa Cruz de la Sierra Cathedral, is the main Catholic church in the city of Santa Cruz de la Sierra, Bolivia. It is located in the city center, opposite the 24 de Septiembre Square.

The first church was built by the Mercedarian Fray Diego de Porres in times of Viceroy Francisco Álvarez de Toledo. In 1770, Bishop Ramán de Herbosos rebuilt the church, commending the sacristan Antonio Lombardo greatest gift the execution of the works. At the time of Marshal Andrés de Santa Cruz (1838), the old temple was replaced by a new church of eclectic style, designed by the French architect Felipe Bertres. It is notable for its wooden vaults and the pictorial decoration that covers them. In the main altar part of the original carved silver coating of the Jesuit mission of San Pedro de Moxos it is conserved. Four sculptural reliefs from the same mission are also exhibited.

See also
Roman Catholicism in Bolivia

References

Roman Catholic cathedrals in Bolivia
Buildings and structures in Santa Cruz de la Sierra
Basilica churches in Bolivia
Baroque church buildings in Bolivia